The 2019 Nigerian House of Representatives elections in Benue State was held on February 23, 2019, to elect members of the House of Representatives to represent Benue State, Nigeria.

Overview

Summary

Results

Ado/Obadigbo/Opkokwu 
A total of 5 candidates registered with the Independent National Electoral Commission to contest in the election. PDP candidate Francis Agbo won the election, defeating APC Michael Unogwu and 3 other party candidates. Agbo received 57.65% of the votes, while Unogwu received 30.20%.

Apa/Agatu 
A total of 9 candidates registered with the Independent National Electoral Commission to contest in the election. LP candidate Godday Samuel won the election, defeating PDP Adamu Entonu and 7 other candidates. Samuel received 34.83% of the votes, while Entonu received 34.07%.

Buruku 
A total of 12 candidates registered with the Independent National Electoral Commission to contest in the election. PDP candidate Kpam Sokpo won the election, defeating APC Joseph Ityav and 10 other party candidates. Sokpo received 50.64% of the votes, while Ityav received 33.26%.

Gboko/Tarka 
A total of 9 candidates registered with the Independent National Electoral Commission to contest in the election. APC candidate John Dyegh won the election, defeating PDP Bernard Nenger and 7 other candidates. Dyegh received 56.90% of the votes, while Nenger received 42.36%.

Guma/Makurdi 
A total of 10 candidates registered with the Independent National Electoral Commission to contest in the election. PDP candidate Benjamin Mzondu won the election, defeating APC Conrad Utaan and 8 other candidates. Mzondu received 50.82% of the votes, while Conrad Utaan received 38.02%.

Gwer East/Gwer West 
A total of 9 candidates registered with the Independent National Electoral Commission to contest in the election. PDP candidate Mark Gbillah won the election, defeating APC Victor Torsar and 7 other party candidates. Gbillah received 61.56% of the votes, while Torsar received 33.02%.

Katsina-Ala/Ukum/Logo 
A total of 19 candidates registered with the Independent National Electoral Commission to contest in the election. PDP candidate Richard Gbande won the election, defeating APC Solomon Wombo and 17 other party candidates. Gbande received 46.60% of the votes, while Wombo received 21.79%.

Konshisha/Vandeikya 
A total of 13 candidates registered with the Independent National Electoral Commission to contest in the election. APGA candidate Herman Hembe won the election, defeating APC Dorathy Mato and 11 other party candidates. Hembe received 39.75% of the votes, while Mato received 33.07%.

Kwande/Ushongo 
A total of 13 candidates registered with the Independent National Electoral Commission to contest in the election. PDP candidate Robert Tyough won the election, defeating APC Benjamin Wayo and 11 other party candidates. Tyough received 41.23% of the votes, while Wayo received 29.10%.

Oju/Obi 
A total of 13 candidates registered with the Independent National Electoral Commission to contest in the election. APGA candidate David Ogewu won the election, defeating PDP Samson Aja and 11 other party candidates. Ogewu received 50% of the votes, while Aja  received 26.41%.

Otukpo/Ohimini 
A total of 13 candidates registered with the Independent National Electoral Commission to contest in the election. APGA candidate Blessing Onuh won the election, defeating PDP Egli Ahubi and 11 other party candidates. Onuh received 47.43% of the votes, while Ahubi received 33.71%.

References 

Benue
Benue State elections